Sanjiv Chaurasia is an Indian politician. He was elected to the Bihar Legislative Assembly from Digha in the 2015 Bihar Legislative Assembly election as a member of the Bharatiya Janata Party.

References

1969 births
Living people
Bharatiya Janata Party politicians from Bihar
People from Patna
Bihar MLAs 2015–2020
Bihar MLAs 2020–2025